Orechová is a village and municipality in the Sobrance District, Košice Region, eastern Slovakia.

Orechová may also refer to:
 Orechová Potôň, a village and municipality in the Dunajská Streda District in the Trnava Region of south-west Slovakia

See also 
 Lyubov Orechova, a Soviet sprint canoer
 Ořechov (disambiguation)
 Orekhov (surname)